St. James-Assiniboia School Division (SJASD) is a school division in the St. James-Assiniboia area of Winnipeg, Manitoba.

Schools
There are 26 schools in the division: 15 elementary, six middle, and four high schools. Six of these schools offer French immersion. Most of its schools are in Winnipeg, however one is located in Headingley and the other in Brooklands.

Elementary 
 Athlone School
 Brooklands School
 Buchanan School
 Crestview School
 École Assiniboine
 École Bannatyne
 École Robert Browning
 École Voyageur
 Heritage School
 Lakewood School
 Linwood School
 Phoenix School
 Sansome School
 Stevenson-Britannia School
 Strathmillan School

Middle schools 
 Bruce Middle School
 École Ness
 George Waters Middle School
 Golden Gate Middle School
 Hedges Middle School
 Lincoln Middle School

High schools 

 Collège Sturgeon Heights Collegiate
 Jameswood Alternative School
 John Taylor Collegiate
 St. James Collegiate
 Westwood Collegiate

See also
List of school districts in Manitoba

References

External links
 St. James-Assiniboia School Division Official Website

School divisions in Winnipeg
St. James, Winnipeg